Chifubu is a small urban area in Ndola, Zambia. The township is part of the Chifubu constituency.

References

Ndola
Populated places in Copperbelt Province